Edwin Noel Auguste Plowden, Lord Plowden, GBE, KCB (6 January 1907 – 15 February 2001) was a British industrialist and public servant in the Treasury.

Career
Before the Second World War, Plowden joined C Tennant Sons & Co, commodity dealers. As he spoke French and German and knew the European mainland well, he was put in charge of selling Palestine potash, in competition with the European potash cartel; he did so to such effect that his firm, as it had hoped, was invited to join the cartel.

During the war, he served in the Ministry of Economic Warfare, and later joined the Ministry of Aircraft Production, in which he remained until 1946. During 1945–46 he was chief executive in succession to Air Chief Marshal Sir Wilfrid Freeman.

He returned after the War to the private sector, but then was appointed Chief Planning Officer to the Cabinet Office in March 1947. The group was called the Central Economic Planning Staff and Plowden headed it for over six years.

Korean War
"I was at this stage put in charge of a working party set up to formulate an official reply to the Americans and, over the next year or so, was to be responsible for the general economic supervision of the rearmament programme."

Conservative Government
Rab Butler, Chancellor of the Exchequer (1951–55) inherited Plowden after the Conservatives took power in 1951. He commented, "But I depended on Edwin Plowden, as head of the economic planning staff, to interpret and give practical edge to the advice generated by the less voluble and extrovert Hall (Robert Hall, Lord Roberthall), to act as vulgarisateur or publicist for his ideas. Plowden was to be my faithful watchdog in chief, and his departure for industry in 1953 undoubtedly weakened my position and that of the British economy".

Personal life
His wife, Bridget (née Bridget Horatia Richmond; 1910–2000), chaired the group which authored and published the 1967 Plowden Report on primary education. She was created a Dame Commander of the Order of the British Empire (DBE).

Death
 Lord Plowden died of hypertension in 2001, aged 94, one year after his wife's death. He predeceased his two sons and one daughter while another daughter predeceased both Sir Edwin and Dame Bridget Plowden.

Arms

Plowden was appointed a Knight Commander of the Order of the British Empire (KBE) in the 1946 Birthday Honours, a Knight Commander of the Order of the Bath (KCB) in the 1951 Birthday Honours and was promoted to a Knight Grand Cross of the Order of the British Empire (GBE) in the 1987 Birthday Honours.

He was created a life peer with the title Baron Plowden, of Plowden in the county of Shropshire on 17 February 1959.

References

External links 

 The Papers of Lord Plowden held at Churchill Archives Centre

1907 births
2001 deaths
Knights Commander of the Order of the Bath
Knights Grand Cross of the Order of the British Empire
Crossbench life peers
Deaths from hypertension
Place of birth missing
Place of death missing
Life peers created by Elizabeth II